Mogilev Province or Mahiloŭ Province may refer to:
Mahilyow Voblast of Belarus or Byelorussian SSR
Mogilev Guberniya of the Russian Empire (1802–1919)